Dusty's Trail is an American Western/comedy series starring Bob Denver and Forrest Tucker that aired in syndication from September 1973 to March 1974. The series is a western-themed reworking of Denver's previous series Gilligan's Island.

The series, set in the latter 19th century,  is about a small, diverse cluster of lost travelers who become separated from their wagon train. Country music singer Mel Street sang the theme song.

Storyline
Two coachmen and five passengers of a wagon and stagecoach become separated from their wagon train on the way to California in the early 1870s. The group includes wagonmaster Mr. Callahan and his shotgun lookout Dusty, Mr. and Mrs. Brookhaven (a wealthy Eastern banker and his wife), a book smart civil engineer named Andy, dance-hall girl Lulu McQueen, and farm girl Betsy. The show follows their adventures while they attempt to return to their wagon train. According to the theme song, "...Dusty's the reason for their plight, thanks to Dusty – nothing's right".

Cast
Bob Denver as Dusty (The Gilligan role)
Forrest Tucker as Mr Callahan (The Skipper role)
Ivor Francis as Carson Brookhaven (The Thurston Howell III role)
Jeannine Riley as Lulu McQueen (The Ginger role)
Lori Saunders as Betsy McGuire  (The Mary Ann role)
Lynn Wood as Daphne Brookhaven (The Lovie Howell role)
Bill Cort as Andy Boone (The Professor role)

Episodes

Theatrical film

Four episodes of the series were edited together into a theatrical film, The Wackiest Wagon Train in the West, and released in movie theaters in August 1976.  In order, the four episodes are:
 "Tomahawk Territory" (ep. 8)
 "Horse of Another Color" (ep. 3)
 "There Is Nothing Like a Dame" (ep. 2)
 "The Not So Magnificent Seven" (ep. 1)

Reception and cancellation
The show was created for Denver by Sherwood Schwartz, who had also created its progenitor, Gilligan's Island. (At the time, Schwartz had been actively trying to get Gilligan's Island revived for several years; after Dusty's Trail ended, Schwartz conceded to an animated Gilligan adaptation that debuted in fall 1974.) Jeannine Riley and Lori Saunders were both former cast members of Petticoat Junction, while Forrest Tucker had previously played a crusty Old West character in F Troop. According to U.S. television researchers Tim Brooks and Earle Marsh, the reason for the show's failure was that it was too obviously a rewrite of Gilligan's Island.

Denver professed on several occasions that Dusty's Trail was his favorite show to perform. 

During its run in the 1973–1974 season, it was reported Dusty's Trail barely made the top 50 shows, a fairly respectable showing for a first-run syndicated program; nonetheless the program was canceled after its lone season, with 26 episodes produced out of an originally planned 30.

Observations
Each of the seven main characters is derivative of those of Gilligan's Island, a previous series that had been created by Sherwood Schwartz, who had been trying unsuccessfully to sell a Gilligan's Island revival for several years (and eventually succeeded, in animated form, with The New Adventures of Gilligan in 1974).

 Dusty was based on Bob Denver's Gilligan's Island character, Gilligan.
 Tucker's role as the wagonmaster was based on The Skipper, originally played by Alan Hale, Jr.
 The millionaire Brookhavens (Ivor Francis and Lynn Wood) were essentially the same characters as the Howells (Jim Backus and Natalie Schafer) from Gilligan's Island.
 Music hall singer Lulu (Jeannine Riley) was an adaptation of Ginger Grant, the movie star played by Tina Louise
 Girl-next-door Betsy (Lori Saunders) replaced farm-girl Mary Ann Summers (Dawn Wells)
 Andy (William Cort) filled the role of the savant Professor (Russell Johnson)

Other elements of the series are reproduced/recycled:

The Gilligan's Island shipwreck, following what was meant to be a "three hour tour," is now replaced with a wagon being lost in the wilderness after being separated from the wagon train.
The main mission of the plot was to reunite with the main wagon train, mirroring the castaways' attempt at rescue.
Head hunters are now replaced by American Indians, who bear resemblance to the Hekawi, a fictional tribe from Forrest Tucker's previous series, F Troop.
Criminals were encountered in both series; with Dusty's Trail being bandits and desperados, and occasionally marooned felons would end up on Gillian's island.

Home media
Several Dusty's Trail episodes, for reasons not entirely clear, were not properly copyrighted; these were among some of the last episodes of a regular TV series (in order of production) to lapse into the public domain, and some of the few to do so that were produced after 1963. Because of this, the show became widely available in reruns and on discount DVDs.

On October 12, 2004, Brentwood Home Video released 17 episodes of the series on Region 1 DVD in the United States.

References

External links 
 
 
 Dusty's Trail episodes at the Internet Archive

1973 American television series debuts
1974 American television series endings
1970s American sitcoms
English-language television shows
First-run syndicated television programs in the United States
Television series by Metromedia
Television series set in the 1870s
Television shows set in California
1970s Western (genre) television series
Television series created by Sherwood Schwartz